The 1924 Puerto Rican general election was held under the colonial rule of the United States, so only municipalities were able to democratically elect their representatives. Puerto Rico's At-large congressional district election was won by Félix Córdova Dávila of the Partido Republicano (Republican Party) who beat socialist Fernando J. Géigel.

At the time there were two major political parties, the Partido Republicano (Republican Party) who after 1924 split and became the Pure Republicans while the other group joined the Union Party of Puerto Rico.
and the Union Party of Puerto Rico.

References

General elections in Puerto Rico
1924 in Puerto Rico
1924 elections in the Caribbean